PT, Pt, or pt may refer to:

Arts and entertainment 
 P.T. (video game), acronym for Playable Teaser, a short video game released to promote the cancelled video game Silent Hills
 Porcupine Tree, a British progressive rock group

In business

Businesses 
 Capital Cargo International Airlines (IATA airline designator PT)
 West Air Sweden (IATA airline designator PT)
 Putnam Transit, a bus system that serves Putnam County, New York
 Portugal Telecom, the largest telecommunications service provider in Portugal
 Piteå-Tidningen, a Swedish local newspaper

Business terminology 
 Part-time job
 Perseroan Terbatas, the Indonesian name for a limited liability company

Political parties 
 Partido dos Trabalhadores (Brazil) (Workers' Party), a Brazilian political party
 Parti des travailleurs (France) (Workers' Party), a defunct French political party
 Partido dos Trabalhadores (Guinea-Bissau) (Workers' Party), a Bissau-Guinean political party
 Partido del Trabajo (Mexico) (Labor Party), a Mexican political party

Places 
 Promontory or point, a prominent mass of land that overlooks lower-lying land or a body of water

Specific places 
 Portugal (ISO country code PT)
 .pt, an Internet top-level domain name for Portugal
 Portuguese language (ISO 639 alpha-2 code "pt")
 Palestinian territories, comprise the West Bank (including East Jerusalem) and the Gaza Strip
 Pistoia, a city in Italy
 Port Townsend, Washington, a city in Jefferson County, Washington, in the United States
 Pacific Time Zone, a time zone 8 hours behind UTC

Science, technology, and mathematics

Biology and medicine 
 pt, patient, a medical abbreviation
 Physical therapy/Physiotherapy or Physical therapist/Physiotherapist
 Pararosaniline, Toluidine histological stain
 Percutaneous surgery
 Pertussis toxin, a protein-based exotoxin which causes whooping cough
 Petunidin, an anthocyanidin plant pigment
 Prothrombin time, a measurement of blood coagulation

Computing 
 .pt, an Internet top-level domain name for Portugal
 Panorama Tools, a suite of programs and libraries originally by Helmut Dersch
 Pluggable Transport, an API in the Tor Project
 Penetration testing, checking to see how secure a computer system is

Physics and chemistry 
 Platinum, symbol Pt, a chemical element
 Polythiophene, a molecule
 Total pressure (P), in fluid dynamics

Transportation 
 PT boat, a type of small fast ship used by the US Navy in World War II
 Public transport, or public transit
 Chrysler PT Cruiser, a car model
 PT-91, a military tank

Units of measurement 
 Percentage point (pt), a unit for the arithmetic difference of two percentages
 pt, a measurement in the print industry for thickness of card stock
 Pint (Pt.), a unit of volume or capacity
 Point (typography) (Pt.), a unit of measure used in typography

Other uses in science, technology, and mathematics 
 Permian-Triassic extinction event, a mass extinction between the Paleozoic and Mesozoic eras
 Peat, in the Unified Soil Classification System
 Post-tensioned concrete, a reinforcement method in structural engineering
 Potential transformer, an electrical component for changing voltage
 Pressure treated wood

Sport 
 Personal trainer, in fitness and bodybuilding
 Pro Tour (disambiguation)

Physical fitness 
 Physical education, known in many Commonwealth countries as physical training or PT
 Physical training instructor, in the British & Commonwealth military; also in the British police
 , physical training

Other uses 
 Pandit, a Hindu honorific applied to certain scholars of law, religion, philosophy or music
 Perpetual traveler or "permanent tourist"
 Perspectives on Terrorism, an academic journal
 Pro tempore, a Latin phrase "for the time being" (temporary)
 Pyramid Texts, an ancient Egyptian funerary text
 Pussy torture, a sexual activity involving pain or pressure applied to the human vagina or vulva.

See also 
 P. T. (disambiguation)
 Petey (disambiguation)
 Abbreviation of Pumper Tanker in Fire Rescue Victoria